Elmer L. B. Wicks (August 8, 1895 – death date unknown) was an American Negro league third baseman in the 1920s.

A native of Crisfield, Maryland, Wicks played three seasons for the Harrisburg Giants from 1922 to 1924. In 17 recorded games, he posted 12 hits and five RBI in 70 plate appearances.

References

External links
 and Baseball-Reference Black Baseball stats and Seamheads

1895 births
Place of death missing
Year of death missing
Harrisburg Giants players
Baseball third basemen
Baseball players from Maryland
People from Crisfield, Maryland